Eski Ordu Marşı ("Ancient Army March") is a Rast Mehter song composed by Muallim İsmail Hakkı Bey (1865-1927).

Lyrics

Ey şanlı ordu, ey şanlı asker
Haydi gazanfer umman-ı safter
Bir elde kalkan, bir elde hançer
Serhadde doğru ey şanlı asker.

Deryada olsa herşey muzaffer
Dillerde tekbir, Allahü ekber

Allahü ekber, Allahü ekber
Ordumuz olsun daim muzaffer.

English

O glorious army! O great soldier,
Come on the glorious sea of bastion smashers,
A shield in one hand and the dagger in the other,
Let's advance to the border O gallant soldier.

May everything be victorious in this sea.
Chanting the takbir, "Allah is the greatest"

Allah is greatest, Allah is greatest,
May our army be eternally victorious.

References

External links
 List of other Mehter Marsi songs

Turkish music
Military music
Military of the Ottoman Empire
Turkish military marches